Mani Liaqat (born 25 April 1984) is a Manchester-based British-Asian actor and comedian. He is known for his bizarre rants, portly figure, witty voice and mixture of Punjabi/Urdu/Hindi and British everyday-humour.

Mani is best known as the winner of The Great Indian Laughter Challenge UK on Star One, Star Plus Production Sky Channel 783. Mani has been awarded as UK's funniest Asian Comedian 

Alongside his comedy Mani is concentrating on his Acting and Presenting career as well. More recently he has made a successful move into dramatic world of acting. He has already appeared in  Bollywood feature  Film Pusher (Nasha) 2010  alongside Bollywood actress Mahima Chaudhry directed by Assad Raja

Also playing a cameo character alongside fellow mancunian actor Ali Khalid, Abid Ali (actor) and Noman Ijaz in a Pakistani drama serial SARD AAG Directed by Yasir Akhtar based on British Pakistanis aired on a global satellite channel Hum TV currently aired weekly in the U.K on Venus TV.

Most Recently Mani was invited as The Best British Asian Comedian to appear on Geo TV's renowned talk show The Nadia Khan Show  that  delight its viewers with Nadia's trademark style of conducting informal and candid celebrity interviews.

Mani Liaqat also gave an electrifying and memorable performance at the Miss Bollywood UK 2009  at Birmingham biggest venue ICC on Broad Street which had judges and the audiences in tears of laughter. Reena Patel was crowned Miss Bollywood 2009. At the event were present the hottest names of the industry such as Manisha Koirala, Michelle Collins (EastEnders), Joseph Marcell (The Fresh Prince of Bel-Air), Lisa Lazarus (Actress in Veer (film)), Rohit Verma (Designer), Raza Malal (Writer/Director), Karl Ude-Martinez (actor), Harvinder "Harry" Anand (Music director), Taz (singer) (Stero Nation), Karl George (Adjudicator) Hakille (dancer) and hosted by Raj& Pablo (BBC Asian Network).

External links
 
 Facebook Fanpage
 Manchester Evening Asian News Article covering Mani
 Pusher 2007 Movie
 Mani on The Nadia Khan Show
 Mani performing on The Great Indian Laughter Challenge UK
 Mani at the Miss Bollywood UK 2009

References

1984 births
Living people
English male comedians
English people of Pakistani descent
Punjabi people
English male film actors
English male television actors
Place of birth missing (living people)
British film actors of Pakistani descent
British comedians of Pakistani descent